Vincent La Chapelle (1690 or 1703 – 14th of July 1745 in Apeldoorn) was a French master cook who is known to have worked for Phillip Dormer Stanhope (4th Earl of Chesterfield), William IV, Prince of Orange, John V of Portugal and Queen Marie Leczinska of France.

Biography
La Chapelle travelled to Spain and Portugal and wrote The Modern Cook while in Chesterfield's employment (a French edition was published in 1735). An Eighteenth-century classic of the culinary arts, it exercised a strong influence on aristocratic cuisine in England. To some degree, La Chapelle borrowed some of his recipes from his predecessor François Massialot, who composed a book on court cookery and confectionery in 1692.

La Chapelle was the first writer to insist on a rupture with the past and to characterise his cooking as modern. While working in London, La Chapelle published his text first in three English volumes in 1733 and then in four French volumes in 1735. Entitled Le Cuisinier moderne, the work was the forerunner of a lavishly illustrated series of cookbooks that might equally well be considered art books. In 1742 he published Le cuisinier moderne, qui apprend à donner toutes sortes de repas, en gras & en maigre, d'une manière plus délicate que ce qui en a été écrit jusqu'à présent : divisé en cinq volumes, avec de nouveaux modéles de vaisselle, & des desseins de table dans le grand goût d'aujourd'hui, gravez en taille-douce ... / par le sieur Vincent La Chapelle in The Hague. The cookbook has some prints of table settings and is easy to read; not very much has changed since. Many recipes are based on typical Dutch or English dishes, like steak and pies. He used many herbs or expensive oysters, some recipes are low fat, considered with his clientele; some are accompanied with rice, then he called it Indian.

La Chapelle formed a Freemason lodge on 8 November 1734, probably in The Hague or Leeuwarden. There is still a lodge in the Netherlands carrying his name. After the Prince of Orange married Anne, Princess Royal and Princess of Orange in London, he returned to the Netherlands with the cook Vincent la Chapelle. It is very possible they knew each other for some years, since Vincent was the cook of the English ambassador.

It has recently been shown that the Saxon minister Heinrich, Graf von Bruhl, had a chef d'office who also had the surname La Chapelle, and the two made regular visits to the Meissen factory between 1737 and 1740—during the period when the radically inventive Swan service was in production. If the two La Chapelles are one and the same, which remains unknown, it would shed light on the close relationship between pastry and sugar sculpture, and silver and porcelain modelling.

References

Further reading
 Patrick Rambourg, Histoire de la cuisine et de la gastronomie françaises, Paris, Ed. Perrin (coll. tempus n° 359), 2010, 381 pages.

External links
 About a magnificent copy of the very rare First French Edition of La Chapelle’s classic of 18th century culinary history
 About a tureen made for Phillip Dormer Stanhope
 Ratafia of Quinces
 Freemasons Lodge Vincent la Chapelle 
 Recette de la tarte au citron meringuée
 Recipe for choux de paysans (kale with chestnuts)
 Histoire politique de la gastronomie

French chefs
1745 deaths
Year of birth uncertain